Mahakoshal or Mahakaushal is a region of central India. Mahakoshal lies in the upper or eastern reaches of the Narmada River valley in the Indian state of Madhya Pradesh. Jabalpur is the largest city in the region. Nimar region lies to the west, in the lower reaches of the Narmada valley.

Mahakoshal is now predominantly a Hindi-speaking area, although it is actually the native region of 
Dravidian languages such as Gondi, Pardhan and Bharia. Due to the prevalence of Gondi the region is also called Gondwana by Gondi speakers. Other languages used in the region include Bagheli and Marathi.

Geography
The Vindhya Range forms the northern boundary of the region; north of the Vindhya Range lie the regions of Malwa to the northwest, Bundelkhand to the north, and Bagelkhand to the northeast. Chhattisgarh state lies to the east, and the Vidarbha region of Maharashtra state lies to the south across the Satpura Range. Cities and districts of the region include Jabalpur,  Shahdol, Katni, Chhindwara, Narsinghpur, Mandla, Dindori, Seoni and  Balaghat.

History
Dynasties that held the territory include the Gonds, Kalachuri, Satavahanas, and Marathas. During the British Raj Mahakoshal was part of the Central Provinces which contained two distinct linguistic regions: Mahakoshal (Hindi and Gondi) and Vidarbha (Marathi). The two linguistic regions could not be fully integrated as a unit owing to regional and cultural differences.

Demand for a Separate State
It is highly demanded state from an undivided Madhya Pradesh due to lack of recognition and development. An initiative has been started by MP High Court Bar council with a demand of a new state of "Rewakhand" with 25 districts of Mahakaushal and Bundelkhand.

See also
 Central Provinces
 Mahakoshal Express
Proposed states and territories of India

References

Regions of Madhya Pradesh
Proposed states and union territories of India
Historical regions